Ieva Zunda (born 20 July 1978 in Tukums) is a Latvian athlete. Her main event is the 400 metres hurdles, but she also competes in the 400 and 800 metres.

Internationally she has competed in the 400 m hurdles. She did not make it past the first round at the 1999 and 2003 World Championships. At the 2004 Summer Olympics in Athens she was fourth in her heat with a result of 56.21 seconds.

In 2008 Zunda tried to reach the Olympic entry standard both in 400 m and 400 m hurdles. Shortly before the deadline - on 23 July, Ieva finally reached the entry standard in 400 m hurdles (56.50), as she clocked 56.34 seconds. She finished fifth in her heat, again missing out on a place in the second round.

Personal bests

References

External links
 
 
 

1978 births
Living people
People from Tukums
Athletes (track and field) at the 2004 Summer Olympics
Athletes (track and field) at the 2008 Summer Olympics
Olympic athletes of Latvia
Latvian female sprinters
Latvian female middle-distance runners
Latvian female hurdlers
World Athletics Championships athletes for Latvia